Old Batesburg Grade School, also known as Batesburg Elementary School, is a historic elementary school building located at Batesburg-Leesville, Lexington County, South Carolina. It was built about 1912, and is a two-story, brick Neo-Classical school building with a central tetrastyle portico and flanking pavilions. The central portico has four colossal Tuscan order columns. An auditorium is located at the rear of the building. Wing additions were added about 1945.  It was the town's first public school, housing grades 1–11.

It was listed on the National Register of Historic Places in 1983.

As of 2015, the building was used as the administrative offices of Lexington County School District Three.

See also
Batesburg and Leesville schools built with the addition of the Rosenwald Fund

References

School buildings on the National Register of Historic Places in South Carolina
Neoclassical architecture in South Carolina
School buildings completed in 1912
Schools in Lexington County, South Carolina
National Register of Historic Places in Lexington County, South Carolina
1912 establishments in South Carolina